Bay Area Transit Authority (BATA) is a public transit agency that serves Grand Traverse and Leelanau counties in the US state of Michigan.

History
BATA was formed February 1, 1985, out of the former Leelanau County transit combined with the Dial-A-Ride service in Traverse City, Michigan. Over the years BATA has changed routes and branding their reputation to riders with technology improvements on buses. BATA launched their new Bayline service on June 25th, 2018. This is the first high-frequency, east-west connection for the region, with buses every 15 - 17 minutes, 6am – 9pm, and it is fare-free.

Services
 City & village links
 City loops
 Village loops
 Bayline
 Indian Trails (Hall St. transfer station)
 Benzie Bus (Hall St. transfer station)
 KAT Bus(Route 14 Turtle Creek Casino bus stop)
 WEX Express(Route 1,5 and 12 Grand Traverse Mall Stop)

Routes

References

Bus transportation in Michigan
Transportation in Grand Traverse County, Michigan
Transportation in Leelanau County, Michigan